The Anonymous Heroes or Wu ming ying xiong  is a 1971 Hong Kong Shaw Brothers  action-comedy film directed by Chang Cheh.

Cast
David Chiang
Ti Lung
Ching Li
Ku Feng as  Brother Wan
Ching Miao
Yang Chih Ching
Wang Chung

External links
 
 The Anonymous Heroes at HKcinemamagic.com

1971 films
1970s action comedy films
Hong Kong action comedy films
1970s Mandarin-language films
Shaw Brothers Studio films
Films directed by Chang Cheh
1971 comedy films
1970s Hong Kong films